Bissong is a surname. Notable people with the surname include:

Omotu Bissong, Nigerian model, television presenter, and actress
Clement Bissong (born 1983), Nigerian footballer